Mumbai Indians (MI) is a franchise cricket team based in Mumbai, India, which plays in the Indian Premier League (IPL). They were one of the eight teams that competed in the 2009 Indian Premier League. They were captained by Sachin Tendulkar.

Squad

Standings
Mumbai Indians finished seventh in the league stage of IPL 2009.

References

2009 Indian Premier League
Mumbai Indians seasons